The discography of the South Korean singer Chen consists of three extended plays, eight singles (including two as featured artist), one promotional single and nine appearances in soundtracks.

In April 2016, Chen and rapper Heize released "Lil' Something (썸타)", a song produced by Ryu Jae-hyun member of Vibe, as the ninth weekly single of SM Entertainment's Station music project. In October 2016, he collaborated with DJ Alesso on another song for the Station project titled "Years". In January 2017, Chen collaborated with Dynamic Duo in a song titled "Nosedive", becoming the first artist to be featured in the group's collaboration project "Mixxxture". In November 2017, Chen collaborated with South Korean singer 10cm on a song titled "Bye Babe" for the second season of SM Entertainment's Station project.

Chen released his first extended play, titled April, and a Flower on April 1, 2019. The standard EP version sold more than 185,000 copies in South Korea in its first month of release.

Extended plays

Singles

As lead artist

As featured artist

Promotional singles

Collaborations

Soundtrack appearances

Other appearances

Other charted songs

Songwriting

Music videos

Notes

References

External links 
  

Discographies of South Korean artists
K-pop discographies